Lalengzama Vangchhia  (born 12 November 1999) is an Indian professional footballer who plays as a midfielder for Churchill Brothers in the I-League.

Career 
Lalengzama made his professional debut for the Churchill Brothers against Punjab F.C. on 1 December 2019 at Fatorda Stadium, He was brought in the 76th minute as Churchill Brothers won 3–0.

Career statistics

References

1999 births
Living people
People from Lunglei
Indian footballers
Churchill Brothers FC Goa players  
Footballers from Mizoram
I-League players
India youth international footballers
Association football midfielders
AIFF Elite Academy players
I-League 2nd Division players